Richard Doyle (10 January 1948 – 22 June 2017) was a British author of thriller novels.

Biography
Doyle was born in Saint Saviour, Guernsey, and on his third birthday was presented at the court of Emperor Haile Selassie. He lived variously in Tripoli, Ethiopia, Kuwait, Kenya, Morocco, Libya, Beirut, Barbados, Antigua, France, Greece, Ireland, and the United States. Home for several years was a plantation house in the West Indies, then on Cape Ann, followed by a fortified bastide in Gascony. He spent a short time at Rugby School before completing his studies at the British Army school in Tripoli. He went on to read law at Lincoln College, Oxford. As a young man he taught English to the Colombian author Gabriel García Márquez.

Deluge, Doyle's first novel, was published in 1976. Imperial 109 was published the following year and became a wild success in both the United Kingdom and the United States, selling over a million copies. His 2002 novel Flood was a best-seller and was adapted for the 2007 film of the same title. He was considered an expert on matters related to climate change and the flooding of London. He was invited to the "London Under Water" lecture from the Royal Geographical Society's "21st Century Challenges" series in June 2008.

Doyle was expelled from Tripoli by military coup, lectured on fighter training to the Italian Air Force and survived several earthquakes, two hurricanes, and a tsunami. He appeared regularly on radio and TV, talking about the flood threat, climate change, writing and his own life.

Doyle lived with his wife Sally and son Caspar in Oxford. Both Doyle and his son Caspar are keen yachtsmen.

Bibliography

Deluge (1976)
Imperial 109 (1977)
Pacific Clipper (1987)
Havana Special (1982)
Executive Action (1998)
Flood (2002)
Volcano (2006)
Mute (2012) eBook

Notes

External links
 Richard Doyle's Flood site
 

British thriller writers
20th-century British novelists
21st-century British novelists
People educated at Rugby School
Alumni of Lincoln College, Oxford
Writers from Oxford
1948 births
Living people
Guernsey writers
British male novelists
20th-century British male writers
21st-century British male writers
Guernsey people